Kolkonjärvi is a medium-sized lake in the Vuoksi main catchment area. It is located in the region Southern Savonia of Finland.

In Finland there are 8 lakes that are called Kolkonjärvi. This is the biggest of them.

See also
List of lakes in Finland

References

Lakes of Rantasalmi